The Grassroots Democratic Party of Germany (abbreviated ) is a political party in Germany. The declared aim of the party is to strengthen grassroots democracy in society and politics, as they consider that many areas of life are dominated by economic interests, profits, and fights for political power. Political scientists and media reports however generally identify the party as primarily a front for the "Querdenker" movement of lockdown opponents and anti-vaccination campaigners.

The party cannot be easily placed on the political spectrum but according to an investigation by RedaktionsNetzwerk Deutschland, its membership combines believers in alternative medicine and esotericism with far right conspiracy theorists such as Reichsbürger.

Federal elections results

See also
 MFG – Austria People – Freedom – Fundamental Rights

References

Political parties in Germany
Political parties established in 2020
Anti-vaccination organizations
Organizations established for the COVID-19 pandemic
Impact of the COVID-19 pandemic on politics